is a Japanese badminton player. She competed in women's doubles at the 1996 Summer Olympics in Atlanta. She won bronze medals in the team competition both at the 1990 Asian Games and the 1994 Asian Games.

She is a sister of Akiko Miyamura.

References

External links

1971 births
Asian Games medalists in badminton
Badminton players at the 1990 Asian Games
Badminton players at the 1994 Asian Games
Badminton players at the 1996 Summer Olympics
Japanese female badminton players
Living people
Medalists at the 1990 Asian Games
Medalists at the 1994 Asian Games
Olympic badminton players of Japan
Asian Games bronze medalists for Japan